Marija Kohn (7 August 1934 – 16 July 2018) was a Croatian actress. She appeared in more than eighty films from 1957 to 2018.

Selected filmography

References

External links

1934 births
2018 deaths
People from Dubrovnik
Croatian Jews
Croatian film actresses
Jewish Croatian actresses
20th-century Croatian actresses
21st-century Croatian actresses
Croatian stage actresses